Ketchikan International Airport  is a state-owned, public-use airport located one nautical mile (2 km) west of the central business district of Ketchikan, a city in Ketchikan Gateway Borough in Alaska, U.S. state that has no direct road access to the outside world or to the airport. The airport is located on Gravina Island, just west of Ketchikan on the other side of the Tongass Narrows. Passengers must take a seven-minute ferry ride across the water to get to the airport from the town.

As per Federal Aviation Administration records, the airport had 108,837 passenger boardings (enplanements) in calendar year 2008, 96,996 enplanements in 2009, and 100,138 in 2010. It is included in the National Plan of Integrated Airport Systems for 2015–2019, which categorized it as a primary commercial service (nonhub) airport (more than 10,000 enplanements per year) based on 103,136 enplanements in 2012.

History
Around the World War II era until the early 1970s, longer range land plane air service to Ketchikan including flights to Seattle were operated via an old military airfield located approximately 20 air miles to the south on Annette Island. Aircraft operated into the Annette Island Airport (ANN) for flights in the local southeast Alaska area included the Grumman Goose and Catalina PBY with these amphibian aircraft being utilized to link the airport with the Ketchikan Harbor Seaplane Base. Longer range flights serving Annette Island were operated with Douglas DC-4 prop aircraft flown by Pan American World Airways during the 1940s followed by Douglas DC-6 and Boeing 377 Stratocruiser aircraft. Other service into the Annette Island Airport included Lockheed Constellation propliners flown by Pacific Northern Airlines during the 1950s and Boeing 707 jetliners flown by Pan Am in the early 1960s. In addition, Annette Island was served with Boeing 720 jetliners operated by Pacific Northern and successor Western Airlines later during the 1960s. Alaska Airlines also operated into Annette Island Airport prior to moving its jet service to Ketchikan International Airport with the opening of this new airfield.

The current airport was opened on August 4, 1973, and was dedicated on the following day. The airport opening was the culmination of an effort by local residents, a 1965 study by the Alaska State Division of Aviation, another study in 1967 choosing the current site on Gravina Island, and land clearing in 1969. One of the first airlines to serve the new airport was Alaska Airlines which inaugurated the first jet service from Seattle to Ketchikan International Airport on August 4, 1973, with a Boeing 720 jetliner. Alaska Air primarily operated Boeing 727-100, 727-200 and 737-200 jetliners (including 737 passenger/cargo Combi aircraft) into the airport before switching to later model Boeing 737 jets. Alaska Airlines has flown from the airport for over 40 years and also operated Grumman Goose and Super Catalina amphibian aircraft into the seaplane base serving Ketchikan prior to the opening of the airfield in 1973. Other airlines that operated jet service into the airport in the past included Wien Air Alaska and MarkAir with both air carriers flying Boeing 737 jets as well as Western Airlines operating Boeing 727-200 jetliners.

Facilities and aircraft
Ketchikan International Airport covers an area of 2,600 acres (1,052 ha) at an elevation of 92 feet (27 m) above mean sea level. It has one asphalt paved runway designated 11/29 which measures 7,500 by 150 feet (2,286 x 46 m) and one water runway for seaplanes designated WNW/ESE which measures 9,500 by 1,500 feet (2896 x 457 m).

In 2004, a new taxiway "Bravo" was added to facilitate taxiing to the end of the frequently used runway 11 (the runway is located about  higher than the apron further up the hillside, requiring long, gently sloped taxiways to either end). Before that taxiway, some smaller planes were allowed to use taxiway "Alpha" to take off and land because it was not worthwhile to backtaxi on the actual runway. In addition this allows the airport's system of taxiways to be used by more than one plane at once. These winds have been known to blow approaching planes out across Tongass Narrows in certain conditions.

For the 12-month period ending January 31, 2018, the airport had 15,959 aircraft operations, an average of 44 per day: 61% air taxi, 33% scheduled commercial, 5% general aviation, and <1% military. At that time there were five aircraft based at this airport: three single-engine, one multi-engine, and one jet.

Ketchikan International Airport Ferry

Because the international airport is on an island separated from Ketchikan a ferry connects the airport to the city, crossing the Tongass Narrows with passengers and vehicles. There are two ferries serving the route between Gravina Island (the airport) and Revillagigedo Island (the city of Ketchikan). There are two departures in every hour in each direction.

Ketchikan is itself on an island unconnected to the mainland. However, it lies on the AK-7 state highway, part of the Alaska Marine Highway.

The attempt to replace this ferry with a bridge became the object of national attention in 2005 that labeled the proposed bridge the "bridge to nowhere."

Proposed road access

There is no road access between Ketchikan and the airport. A proposed bridge, referred to by its detractors as the "bridge to nowhere" despite its linking the city and its airport, has been designed with an estimated cost of $398 million. After protracted attention to the cost of the bridge, the U.S. federal government reversed its decision to fund the bridge in 2007. The money was transferred to the state of Alaska to determine the use of the funds.

Airlines and destinations

Passenger

Alaska Airlines flies Boeing 737-700 and 737-800 jetliners into the airport. Delta operates their flights under the Delta Connection banner via SkyWest Airlines, which flies Embraer ERJ-175 regional jets into the airport on a code sharing basis on behalf of Delta. Alaska Airlines' flights include Boeing 737-700 passenger as well as converted all-cargo Boeing 737-700F jet freighter service.

Cargo

Alaska Airlines operates Boeing 737-700 jet freighters into the airport as well with service to Anchorage, Juneau, Seattle and Sitka.

Charter airlines
 Family Air Tours
 Misty Fjords Air
 Pacific Airways
 SeaWind Aviation
 Southeast Aviation
 Taquan Air

Statistics

Top destinations

Accidents and incidents
 An Alaska Airlines Boeing 727-100 overran the southern end of the runway on April 5, 1976, in rainy weather. The aircraft landed long and too fast. Combined with the sluggish braking from the weather, the pilot decided to perform a go around, even through this was not permitted after the thrust reversers had been deployed. The thrust reversers on the engines didn't fully disengage, so the engines did not produce enough thrust to allow a takeoff. One of the 50 passengers on board died. The 727 trijet subsequently caught fire and was destroyed.
 An Aero Vodochody L-39MS high performance jet trainer crashed during approach on January 25, 2006. The aircraft attempted to land in blowing snow and poor visibility, but struck the water three times before regaining some altitude. Witnesses reported hearing the jet's engines stop, then watching it descend into a large lot. The pilot ejected just before the plane crashed into an occupied mobile home, but struck a tree while in his ejection seat.

See also
 Ketchikan Harbor Seaplane Base (IATA: WFB, FAA LID: 5KE)

References

External links

 
 Topographic map from USGS The National Map
 
 

 TITLE 14 V2 Part 93 Subpart M: Additional Procedures

1973 establishments in Alaska
Airports established in 1973
Airports in Ketchikan Gateway Borough, Alaska